The Brownley Confectionery Building is an historic structure located in  Downtown Washington, D.C.  The architectural firm of Porter & Lockie designed the building, which is one of the last Art Deco commercial buildings in the downtown area.  The limestone façade features aluminum spandrel panels.  It was listed on the National Register of Historic Places in 1994.

References

External links

1932 establishments in Washington, D.C.
Art Deco architecture in Washington, D.C.
Commercial buildings on the National Register of Historic Places in Washington, D.C.